CHQR is a radio station owned by Corus Entertainment operating in Calgary, Alberta, Canada. Broadcasting at AM 770, it airs talk programming. With the exception of one show, all of CHQR's weekday programming is produced in-house. CHQR is also the exclusive radio voice of the Calgary Stampeders. CHQR is also the last AM station in the Calgary market to broadcast in C-QUAM AM Stereo. CHQR is a Class B station on the clear-channel frequency of 770 kHz.

CHQR's studios are located on 17th Avenue Southwest in Calgary, while its transmitters are located just south of the Calgary city limits near De Winton.

As of Winter 2021, CHQR is the most-listened-to radio station in the Calgary market according to a PPM data report released by Numeris.

History
The station originally began broadcasting at 810 AM in 1964 and received approval to move to its current frequency in 1985.

On November 9, 2011, Corus Entertainment Inc., on behalf of its wholly owned subsidiary CKIK-FM Limited applied to the CRTC to add an FM transmitter to serve Calgary on the frequency 106.9 MHz to rebroadcast the programming of CHQR 770. This application was denied on May 24, 2012.

In December 2015, CHQR was added to sister station CKRY-FM's HD2 sub-channel when they activated HD Radio services, becoming the first station in Alberta to do so.

On January 9, 2023, CHQR rebranded as QR Calgary and added an FM simulcast on CFGQ-FM.

Former logos

References

External links
 770 CHQR
 CHQR history - Canadian Communications Foundation

Hqr
Hqr
Hqr
Radio stations established in 1964
1964 establishments in Alberta